Patrick McManus may refer to:

 Pat McManus of Mama's Boys and Celtus
 Patrick McManus (rugby league), rugby league footballer of the 1930s for Castleford
 Patrick McManus (footballer) (1867–1940), Scottish footballer
 Patrick F. McManus (1933–2018), American humor writer
 Patrick J. McManus (1954–2009), Massachusetts attorney and politician
 Pat McManus (1859–1917), baseball player